Adékambi Olufadé (born 7 January 1980 in Lomé) is a former Togolese football midfielder of Nigerian descent.

He was a member of the national team, and was called up to the 2006 World Cup.

His first name is sometimes written Adekanmi or Adekamni, but it should normally be Adékambi.

International career

International goals
Scores and results list Togo's goal tally first.

References

1980 births
Living people
Togolese footballers
Togolese expatriate footballers
Togo international footballers
Ligue 1 players
Lille OSC players
Belgian Pro League players
OGC Nice players
K.S.C. Lokeren Oost-Vlaanderen players
R. Charleroi S.C. players
K.A.A. Gent players
Satellite FC players
Al-Sailiya SC players
Emirates Club players
Dynamic Togolais players
2002 African Cup of Nations players
2006 Africa Cup of Nations players
2006 FIFA World Cup players
Association football midfielders
Expatriate footballers in Guinea
Expatriate footballers in Qatar
Expatriate footballers in the United Arab Emirates
Expatriate footballers in France
Expatriate footballers in Belgium
Qatar Stars League players
UAE Pro League players
21st-century Togolese people